Lady Amabel Kerr (Cowper; 1846 – 15 October 1906) was a British writer of religious literature, biographies, children's literature, and novels. She was also a translator from German to English, and a magazine editor. She was described in the University of Ottawa Review as "a rare example of strenuous devotion to the service of God and His Church, rendered all the more forcible by reason of the obscurity in which she endeavored to shroud her work". Kerr was the author of a number of books, among them: Unravelled Convictions, being the reasons for her conversion; Before Our Lord Came, an Old Testament history for little children; A Mixed Marriage, a novel; Life of Joan of Arc, and Life of Blessed Sebastian Valfre. She died in October 1906.

Early life
Lady Amabel Frederica Henrietta Cowper was born in St George Hanover Square, London, England, 1846. Her father was George Cowper, 6th Earl Cowper, and her mother was Lady Anne Florence de Grey (who after her husband's death succeeded as sixth Baroness Lucas of Crudwell), daughter of Thomas de Grey, 2nd Earl de Grey. Her siblings were:
Lady Henrietta Emily Mary Cowper (d. 1853)
Francis Thomas de Grey Cowper, 7th Earl Cowper (1834–1905)
The Honourable Henry Frederick Cowper (1836–1887)    
Lady Florence Amabel Cowper (1837–1886), married the Honourable Auberon Herbert in 1871.
Lady Adine Eliza Anne Cowper (1840–1868), married the Honourable Julian Fane in 1866.

Career
While still a girl, and before her conversion, she started her literary career with a journal, afterward published with the title Unravelled Convictions, in which she recorded the various mental stages through which she was led through many doubts and bewilderments to find peace and rest in the Catholic Church. It was an instructive history of her feelings and convictions up to November 1868. Thirty years afterward, it was republished in a second edition by the Catholic Truth Society.

She was received into the Catholic Church in 1872, and the following year married Lord Walter Kerr, later Admiral of the Fleet. After her conversion, Lady Amabel was constantly publishing what might serve for instruction or edification. In particular, she was a most strenuous and efficient member of the Catholic Truth Society, a regular attendant at its committee meetings, and one of the most prolific contributors to its literature, most of her work being done for it.

To begin with, she did much to spread amongst Catholics a knowledge of the Bible story by her most successful small volumes, Before Our Lord Came (Old Testament history for young children), Bible Picture Book for Catholic Children, and Life of Our Lord. Of many saints and holy persons, she likewise wrote lives — some on a larger scale as substantial books, others in outline as penny tracts. Of the former class, there were B. Sebastian Valfre; Monsignore Cacciaguerra ("A Precursor of St. Philip"); Joan of Arc; B. Anthony Grassi ("A Saint of the Oratory"); St. Felix of Cantalice ("A Son of St. Francis"); and Sister Chatelain ; or, Forty Years' Work in Westminster. The shorter biographies include those of St. Martin, St. Elizabeth of Hungary, St. Thomas Aquinas, St. Francis Xavier, St. Philip Benizi, Mother Mary Hallahan, and two who commenced life as French naval officers, and a tribute to whom came from Lady Amabel, the wife of a British Admiral; they were Alexis Clerc, and Auguste Marceau.

To devotional literature, Lady Amabel was also a considerable contributor. From the German of Father Maurice Meschler, S.J., she translated The Gift of Pentecost (meditations on the Holy Ghost), and from the letters of François Fénelon, she selected a volume which she entitled Spiritual Counsels. In fiction, too, she produced two stories which achieved some success, despite a purpose. These appeared originally under the titles, A Mixed Marriage and One Woman's Work, the latter being altered when the tale was published separately to The Whole Difference.

Besides all these various productions, Lady Amabel edited the Catholic Magazine, the organ of the Catholic Truth Society, established in 1895, during the greater part of its career, and was on the committee of the Society.

The translation from German to English of Dr. Ludwig Pastor's History of the Popes (1908) was a massive work of which the volume comprising Leo X's pontificate was taken up by Lady Amabel, and she had almost completed the work when in the autumn of 1906, she died.

Personal life
In 1903, it was reported that Lady Amabel was one of the co-heirs to the barony of Butler, other coheirs to the same barony being Mr. Auberon Herbert and Mrs. W. H. Grenfell.
As Lady Amabel's brother, Lord Cowper, 7th Earl Cowper, died childless and there were no other male-line descendants of the first Earl Cowper at the time of his death, his wealth stated mainly devolved to issue of his three married sisters. Amabel's descendants, who later succeeded as Marquesses of Lothian, inherited the Melbourne part of the Cowper estates including Brocket Hall in Hertfordshire and Melbourne Hall in Derbyshire.

George Robinson, Marquis of Ripon was her cousin.

Lady Amabel Kerr died at Melbourne, Derbyshire, England, 15 October 1906, and was buried at St. David's Churchyard, Dalkeith, Midlothian, Scotland.

Selected works

 Unravelled convictions; or 'My road to faith''', 1878
 A Mixed Marriage, 1893
 Auguste Marceau, a sailor's life, 1893
 Alexis Clerc, Sailor and Jesuit (1819-1871.)., 1893
 Blessed Margaret Mary, 1895
 Mother Margaret Hallahan (1803-1868), 1896
 The Life of the Blessed Sebastian Valfré of the Turin Oratory, 1896
 Unravelled Convictions ... Second Edition, 1897
 The Life of Cesare Cardinal Baronius of the Roman Oratory, 1898
 A Bible Picture Book for Catholic Children, 1898
 Saint Martin (317-397.), 1899
 Sister Chatelain: Or, Forty Years' Work in Westminster., 1900
 A Life of Our Lord, 1900
 A Son of St. Francis. St. Felix of Cantalice, 1900
 A Saint of the Oratory: The Life of Blessed Antony Grassi of the Fermo Congregation", 1901
 St. Elizabeth of Hungary, 1207-1231, 1901
 Saint Cecilia, 1902
 The whole difference, 1902
 Saint Philip Benizi, 1902
 Jeanne d'Arc, glorifiée par une anglaise, 1903
 A precursor of st. Philip, Buonsignore Cacciaguerra
 Lives of the Saints for Children: 2nd Series, 1905
 Saint Francis Xavier, 1905
 Saint Thomas Aquinas, 1905
 Saint Genevieve, 1906
 Saint Francis of Assisi, 1906
 St. Thomas of Canterbury, 1906
 Christopher Columbus, 1908
 Saint Philip Benizi (1233-1285), 1908

Notes

References

1846 births
1906 deaths
19th-century British non-fiction writers
19th-century English women writers
20th-century English women writers
English women novelists
British women children's writers
English children's writers
Daughters of British earls
Amabel
19th-century English novelists
20th-century English novelists
English religious writers
20th-century English biographers
British women biographers
20th-century English translators
German–English translators
English Roman Catholic writers
English magazine editors
Women magazine editors
19th-century English nobility